Allison Ira "Mick" Fluker (January 6, 1926 – October 16, 1990) was a politician from Alberta, Canada. He served in the Legislative Assembly of Alberta from 1971 to 1979 as a member of the governing Progressive Conservative caucus.

Political career
Fluker first ran for a seat to the Alberta Legislature in the 1971 general election. He defeated Social Credit incumbent Raymond Reierson and two other candidates to pick up the St. Paul electoral district for his party.

Fluker ran for a second term in the 1975 Alberta general election and defeated three other candidates to hold his seat. Fluker retired from the Assembly at dissolution in 1979.

References

External links
Legislative Assembly of Alberta Members Listing

Progressive Conservative Association of Alberta MLAs
1990 deaths
1926 births
People from Lamont, Alberta